The Painter's Honeymoon is a painting by Frederic Leighton, 1st Baron Leighton, produced  and currently housed at the Museum of Fine Arts, Boston.

History
This is an interesting composition for Leighton, who usually veered towards Classical images and, in particular, favored nudes – the latter were so common in his work that many of his pictures had to be removed from the 1857 exhibition of English art that toured America, because they gave offense.

The Italian man who sat for the newly married painter occurs often in Leighton's work: he was apparently one of the artist's favorite models. Importantly, his hands are painted in fine detail, emphasizing how crucial they are to his work. The soft tones and accuracy with which Leighton painted the couple contrasts obviously with the harshness of the orange tree behind them. Leighton appears to have had difficulty in painting it – on close inspection, the oranges look as though they have been enameled. Generally, the composition and glowing color of the picture reflect the influence of such 16th-century Venetian painters as Giorgione and Titian.

The Painter's Honeymoon was first exhibited at the Royal Academy in 1866 – it appears that Leighton deliberately prevented it from being shown publicly in the years following its completion. As Leighton was renowned for his lack of confidence and shyness, many of his contemporaries believed he felt he had betrayed too much of his own emotion to feel comfortable exhibiting the picture.

References

Bibliography
 Barringer, Tim & Prettejohn, Elizabeth, Frederic Leighton: Antiquity, Renaissance, Modernity (Paul Mellon Center for Studies in British Art), Yale University Press (1999). 
 Barrington, Russel, The Life, Letters and Work of Frederic Leighton, 2 Voll., BiblioBazaar (2010). 
 Newall, Christopher, The Art of Lord Leighton, Phaidon Press (1993).

External links
 The Painter's Honeymoon at the MFA
 Frederic-Leighton.org 114 works by Frederic Leighton
 Frederic Leighton Art

1864 paintings
Paintings by Frederic Leighton
Paintings in the collection of the Museum of Fine Arts, Boston